Acer wuyuanense is a species of maple tree in the family Sapindaceae. It has been found only in Jiangxi Province in southeastern China.

References

External links

 Encyclopedia of Life

wuyuanense
Plants described in 1979
Flora of Jiangxi